This is a list of fictional people associated with the University of Oxford. Some characters attended fictional colleges; others attended genuine colleges at the university.

List
Sir Humphrey Appleby GCB (Baillie, perhaps Balliol College) Yes Minister and Yes Prime Minister
Stephen Barley The Historian by Elizabeth Kostova
Lyra Belacqua (the fictional Jordan) His Dark Materials
Edmund Bertram Mansfield Park
Anthony Blanche Brideshead Revisited
James Bond Tomorrow Never Dies
Lord Brideshead Brideshead Revisited
Tom Brown (St Ambrose's, probably based on Oriel) Tom Brown at Oxford
Prince Bumpo Doctor Dolittle
'Chacko' The God of Small Things
The Clerk of Oxenford The Canterbury Tales
Simon Cormack The Negotiator
Frasier Crane Frasier
Thomas Crown The Thomas Crown Affair
Dick Diver (Rhodes Scholar) Tender Is the Night
Zuleika Dobson by Max Beerbohm
Kivrin Engle Doomsday Book
Gervase Fen (the fictional St Christopher's)  by Edmund Crispin
Edward Ferrars Sense and Sensibility
Lord Sebastian Flyte (Christ Church) Brideshead Revisited
Charles Gardner (the fictional St Sebastian's) Hut 33
Jay Gatsby The Great Gatsby
Rupert Giles Buffy the Vampire Slayer
Patrick Grant (the fictional St Mark's) by Margaret Yorke
Verdant Green (Brazenface) The Adventures of Mr. Verdant Green 
Rev. Mr. Hale (the fictional Plymouth, based on Exeter College) North and South
Basil Hallward The Picture of Dorian Gray
Bill Haydon  by John le Carré
Captain Hook (Balliol) Peter Pan
Master Keaton and his wife (Somerville)
John Kemp Jill
Vanessa Kensington Austin Powers: International Man of Mystery
Chatter Lal Indiana Jones and the Temple of Doom
Canon Leigh (Christ Church) Towers in the Mist by Elizabeth Goudge
Alwin Lowdham The Notion Club Papers
Helen Magnus Sanctuary
Pincher Martin (Christ Church)
Mary, Marie, Margaret and Myfanwy (the fictional St Bride's College (Somerville)) by Philip Larkin
Ranald McKechnie (the fictional Surrey College) A Staircase in Surrey
Jenny Mellor (Merton College) An Education
Colonel Sebastian Moran The Adventure of the Empty House
Chief Inspector Endeavour Morse (St John's) Colin Dexter's Morse novels and TV adaptations
Fox Mulder The X-Files
Duncan Patullo (the fictional Surrey College) A Staircase in Surrey
Paul The Historian by Elizabeth Kostova
Paul Pennyfeather (the fictional Scone College) Decline and Fall
Charles Reding (the fictional St Saviour's College) Loss and Gain
Rumpole of the Bailey (Keble or the fictional St Joseph's)
Mary Russell  by Laurie R. King
Charles Ryder Brideshead Revisited
Connie Sachs  by John le Carré
Donna Sheridan (New College) Mamma Mia!
George Smiley (Lincoln)  by John le Carré
Roderick Spode The Code of the Woosters
Gwen Stacy  (Somerville)  in The Amazing Spider-Man 2
Prince Nasir al-Subaai and Prince Meshal al-Subaai Syriana
Connie Tate The West Wing TV series
Sir Leigh Teabing The Da Vinci Code
Paul Temple by Francis Durbridge
Nigel Thornberry The Wild Thornberrys
Henry Tilney Northanger Abbey
Professor Timberlake (J. R. R. Tolkien)  (the fictional Surrey College) A Staircase in Surrey
Harriet Vane (the fictional Shrewsbury College (Somerville)) by Dorothy L. Sayers
Lord Peter Wimsey (Balliol) by Dorothy L. Sayers
Viscount St George Wimsey (Christ Church) by Dorothy L. Sayers
Bertie Wooster (Magdalen) by P. G. Wodehouse
Lord Henry Wotton The Picture of Dorian Gray
Charles Xavier (Pembroke) X-Men

References

University of Oxford
 Fictional
Fictional University of Oxford people
University of Oxford in fiction